Hasrat Jafarov (born 5 October 2002) is an Azerbaijani Greco-Roman wrestler competing in the 67 kg division. Hasret Jafarov is the gold medalist of World U23 Championships ; World Junior Championships ; European Junior Championships in 2021.  Hasrat Jafarov is the first Greco-Roman wrestler to become a world champion among Azerbaijani U-23 wrestlers.

Career 
Hasrat Jafarov won one of the bronze medals in the men's Greco-Roman 67 kg at 2021 European U23 Wrestling Championship.

He also won the gold medal in that event at the 2021 World Junior Wrestling Championships in Ufa, Russia.

In November 2021, he won the gold medal in that event at the 2021 U23 World Wrestling Championships held in Belgrade, Serbia.

He won the gold medal in his event at the 2021 Islamic Solidarity Games held in Konya, Turkey.

Achievements

References

External links 
 

2002 births
Living people
Azerbaijani male sport wrestlers
European Wrestling Championships medalists
Islamic Solidarity Games medalists in wrestling
Islamic Solidarity Games competitors for Azerbaijan
21st-century Azerbaijani people